The Samuel Train House is a historic house in Weston, Massachusetts.  Built about 1738, it is a good example of a mid-18th century colonial house.  It was home to successive generations of Samuel Trains, who were all active in local politics and the state militia.  The house was added to the National Register of Historic Places in 1976.  It is used as office space for the Rivers School, whose main campus is located across the street.

Description and history
The Samuel Train House is located in southern Weston, on the south side of Winter Street at its junction with Bogle Street.  It is a -story wood-frame structure, four bays wide, with a side-gable roof and large central chimney.  The chimney has six fireplaces, a bake oven, and a distinctive smoke chamber that is oriented to the front, placed where houses of this period normally have a winding staircase.

The land on which this house stands was purchased by one of three consecutive John Trains in c. 1662.  In 1735 Samuel Train, son of the third John Train, purchased  from his father, and built this house three years later.  Samuel was the first of three consecutive Samuels to occupy the house.  All three served in the local militia: the first during the French and Indian War, the second in the American Revolutionary War (where he saw action at the Battles of Lexington and Concord), and the third in the War of 1812.  The latter two were also instrumental in the establishment of the First Baptist Church of Weston.  Samuel I was a town selectman, and Samuel III was a minister and state legislator.  Later owners used the house as a milk house for their dairy operation.

See also
National Register of Historic Places listings in Weston, Massachusetts

References

External links
 Weston Historical Commission: Individual National Register Listings and Buildings with Preservation Restrictions
 History of the Town of Weston, Massachusetts, 1630-1890 by Daniel S. Lamson
 Col. Samuel Train 1785-1845 - third generation Train with the given name "Samuel"
 Vital Records of Weston, MA to the end of the year 1849
 Deborah Brown Train 1747-1828 - wife of the second generation Train with the given name "Samuel"

Houses on the National Register of Historic Places in Middlesex County, Massachusetts
Houses in Weston, Massachusetts